The 2021 Rhythmic Gymnastics World Championships were held from 27 to 31 October 2021 in Kitakyushu, Japan.

Dina Averina broke the record for the most medals won at the Rhythmic Gymnastics World Championships with 22 total medals and also became the first gymnast to win four World all-around titles. Alina Harnasko won the gold medal in the ribbon, becoming the first non-Russian individual World Champion since 2013 and the first Belarusian individual World Champion since 1996. The Russian group won their fifth consecutive World all-around title.

Participating countries

Schedule 

 Wednesday, October 27
 10:00 - 17:40 Individual Qualification - Hoop and Ball
 19:15 - 19:50 Individual Hoop Final
 20:00 - 20:40 Individual Ball Final
 Thursday, October 28
 10:00 - 17:45 Individual Qualification - Clubs and Ribbon
 19:15 - 19:50 Individual Clubs Final
 20:00 - 20:40 Individual Ribbon Final
 Friday, October 29
 16:50 - 20:00 Group All Around
 Saturday, October 30
 14:30 - 16:40 Individual All Around (group B)
 17:00 - 19:10 Individual All Around (group A)
 Sunday, October 31
 17:30 - 18:15 Group 5 Balls Final
 18:20 - 19:10 Group 3 Hoops and 2 Pairs of Clubs Final
 20:20 - 20:40 Closing Ceremony

Medal summary

Individual

Individual Qualification

 The top 8 scores in individual apparatus qualify to the apparatus finals and the top 18 in overall qualification scores advance to the all-around final.
 Only the 3 best results are counted in the total score
 Only the 2 highest ranking players from each country can qualify to each one of the finals.

All-around

Hoop

Ball

Clubs

Ribbon

Group

Squads

All-Around
The top 8 scores in the apparatus qualifies to the group apparatus finals.

5 Balls

3 Hoops + 4 Clubs

Team

Combined Team Ranking

Medal table

Notes

References

Rhythmic Gymnastics World Championships
Rhythmic Gymnastics World Championships
Rhythmic Gymnastics
Gymnastics Championships
Sports competitions in Kitakyushu
Gymnastics in Japan
Rhythmic Gymnastics World Championships